The Journal of Experiential Education is a quarterly peer-reviewed academic journal covering the field of experiential education. The editor-in-chief is Jayson Seaman (University of New Hampshire). It was established in 1978 and is published by SAGE Publications on behalf of the Association for Experiential Education.

Abstracting and indexing
The journal is abstracted and indexed in Scopus and the Science Citation Index Expanded.

References

External links

SAGE Publishing academic journals
English-language journals
Publications established in 1978
Quarterly journals
Education journals